Hellinsia kellicottii (goldenrod borer) is a moth of the family Pterophoridae. It is found in eastern North America, from Massachusetts and New York, south to southern Florida and west to Colorado and Utah. It has also been recorded from Quebec, British Columbia, Arkansas and Wisconsin.

The wingspan is 14–29 mm. Adults are on wing as early as February in Florida and as late as October in New York. There is one generation per year.

The larvae feed on Solidago species. Young larvae bore into the stem. Before reaching the third instar, the larvae leave the upper part of the plant stem through a lateral hole and move down to the mature, wider stem. Here it makes another hole and bores down toward the roots.

Taxonomy
Hellinsia chlorias is sometimes listed as a synonym of Hellinsia kellicottii.

External links
Images
Bug Guide
Phytophagous Insects Associated with Goldenrods (Solidago spp.) in Gainesville, Florida 

kellicottii
Moths of North America
Moths described in 1881